Reginald Bolding is an American politician and a former Democratic member of the Arizona House of Representatives representing District 27 from 2015 to 2023.

Career
Bolding graduated from the University of Cincinnati, where he earned an undergraduate degree in Criminal Justice and International Security.

Bolding has been named to the Phoenix Business Journal's 40 under 40 list.

Bolding sits on the board of directors for the Children's Museum of Phoenix.

Bolding serves as the ranking member on the Arizona House of Representatives Education Committee and also sits on the Ways & Means Committee. Nationally, Bolding is Vice Chair of the National Black Caucus of State Legislators (Western Region). He is also the Chair of the Arizona Black Legislative Caucus. Moreover, Bolding is the Founder & Board Chairman of the Arizona Coalition for Change, a community engagement organization focused on increasing civic engagement throughout the state.

Bolding was a candidate for Secretary of State of Arizona in the 2022 Arizona Secretary of State election. He lost in the Democratic primary to Adrian Fontes on August 2, 2022.

Elections
 2014: Bolding defeated incumbent Norma A. Munoz, Marcelino Quinonez and Edward Blackwell in the Democratic primary. Bolding defeated Myron Jackson in the general election with Bolding receiving 13,950 votes.
 2016: Bolding was reelected.

References

External links

 Official page  at the Arizona State Legislature
 Campaign website
 Biography at Ballotpedia

21st-century African-American politicians
21st-century American politicians
African-American state legislators in Arizona
Living people
Democratic Party members of the Arizona House of Representatives
People from Akron, Ohio
Politicians from Phoenix, Arizona
Year of birth missing (living people)
University of Cincinnati alumni